Hagner is a surname. Notable people with the surname include:

Alexander Burton Hagner (1826–1915), United States federal judge
Matthias Hagner (born 1974), German footballer
Meredith Hagner (born 1987), American actress
Peter V. Hagner (1815–1893), United States Army officer
Viviane Hagner, German violinist